Ozone Football Club Bengaluru, or simply known as Ozone FC, was an Indian professional football club based in Bengaluru, Karnataka. Founded in 2015, the club competed in Bangalore Super Division, the top division of football in the state. Ozone reached the final round of the I-League 2nd Division in the 2017–18, 2018–19 seasons respectively and were also the winner's of the Bangalore Super Division in 2017–18.

History
Ozone Football Club was launched on 3 November 2015 by the Ozone Group with the goal of making the I-League by 2017. The club were quick to make a mark on the local football scene, winning the Bangalore Super Division in December 2015, within their first month of existence.

On 2 August 2016, the club roped former Trinidadian international Cornell Glen as their foreign recruit who represented his country at the 2006 FIFA World Cup. Thus he became the Ozone's first ever world cup player.

On 17 December 2016, it was revealed that the club would participate in the 2016–17 I-League 2nd Division. Ozone were included in Group C along with Pride Sports, Fateh Hyderabad and Kenkre. However, they could not advance beyond group stage.

In the 2017–18 season, after winning the Bangalore Super Division under the guidance of David Booth, Ozone FC continued their form in the I-League Second Division, reaching the final stages, eventually falling short of qualifying for the I-League, where they finished on the third position.

Stadium

Ozone FC plays their home matches of Bangalore Super Division at the New Bangalore Football Stadium, which has a capacity of 8,400 spectators. They have also used the stadium for their previous I-League 2nd Division matches.

Players

Managerial history
 Bert Zuurman (2016–2017)
 Dave Booth (2017–2019)
  Noel Wilson (2019–2020)

Season statistics

Key
Tms. = Number of teams
Pos. = Position in league
Attendance/G = Average league attendance

Team records

Seasons

Notable former players
For all former notable players of Ozone FC with a Wikipedia article, see: Ozone FC players.

World Cup player
  Cornell Glen (2016–2017)

Honours

Domestic (league)
 I-League 2nd Division
Third place (2): 2017–18, 2018–19
 Bangalore Super Division
Champions (2): 2015–16, 2017–18
Runners-up (1): 2018–19

See also
 List of football clubs in Bengaluru
 Bangalore Super Division

References

External links
 Ozone Football Club at The-aiff.com
 Club profile at Worldfootball.net

 
Association football clubs established in 2015
I-League 2nd Division clubs
Football clubs in Bangalore
2015 establishments in Karnataka